This list of museums in St. Louis and non-profit and university art galleries. Museums that exist only in cyberspace (i.e., virtual museums) are not included. Also included are non-profit and university art galleries.

See also List of museums in Missouri.

Museums

See also 
 List of museums and cultural institutions in Greater St. Louis

Defunct museums 
 Cementland, St. Louis, outdoor sculpture park, future uncertain since death of creator in 2011
 Civilian Conservation Corps Museum, St. Louis, closed in 2008
 International Bowling Museum, St. Louis, moved to Arlington, Texas in 2010
 National Video Game and Coin-Op Museum, St. Louis, closed in 1999
 St. Louis Museum

References 

Explore St. Louis

St. Louis
 
Museums
Museums